The Inkadogotane ambush was carried out by ISIL against Malian soldiers on 9 July 2017.

Ambush 
During the fighting, some Malian soldiers fled into the desert, while dozens of others were reportedly killed. After the battle, 29 Malian soldiers went missing, two of whom were later found wandering in the desert. The bodies of eight Malian soldiers were found on 17 July 2017.

References

Conflicts in 2017
Mali War